Macrobathra platychroa is a moth in the family Cosmopterigidae. It was described by Oswald Bertram Lower in 1897. It is found in Australia, where it has been recorded from Victoria.

References

Macrobathra
Moths described in 1897